Andrey Kolodyuk is a Ukrainian entrepreneur and an investor. The founder of the Aventures Capital Venture Fund and OTT service Divan.tv.

In August 2014, Andriy initiated the founding of UVCA (Ukrainian Association of Venture Capital and Direct Investments). In November 2014 he became the chairman of the Supervisory Board of the Association.

According to the ratings of Korrespondent and Focus magazines, he was part of the lists of the richest people of Ukraine (2007–2008). He was chosen by Young Global Leader in the World Economic Forum in 2008.

He is the co-author of the book "Information Society. Ukrainian path."

Education 
In 1996, Andrey Kolodyuk graduated from Kyiv Polytechnic Institute. Since 2000, he has studied at Taras Shevchenko National University of Kyiv.

In 2005, he defended his PhD thesis: "Information Society: Modern Condition and Perspectives of Development in Ukraine" with the specialty "Political Culture and Ideology”.

Entrepreneurship 
Andrey Kolodyuk moved to New York in 1992 and began entrepreneurial activity in the fields of IT, telecommunications and media.

In 1992–1994, he worked in trade and consulting companies, later created his first firm – Universal Trading Enterprise.

In 1994, Andrey Kolodyuk, together with other partners, founded Ukrinvestcom. A year later he returned to Ukraine. UNITRADE was founded by the financial support of Ukrinvestcom, in which Kolodyuk held the post of President of the company during 1994–1998.

In 2001, a venture company AVentures appeared on the market as part of the reorganization of Ukrinvestcom. Under the auspices of AVentures, in the fall of 2003, there were organized road-shows in three major US cities, which presented opportunities of 20 Ukrainian software companies.

In 2003, Kolodyuk opened a representative office of the Ukrainian Software Consortium in Silicon Valley. The office included about 30 Ukrainian companies.

In 2009, Andrey left the company and founded Divan.TV to provide streaming services. In 2016, Divan.tv became available on Smart.TV Philips, Samsung, LG and others in 200 countries.

Investor 
Kolodyuk's first venture project was the Unitrade company in 1994. He invested $5,000 in it.

In 2001, Kolodyuk created a venture company AVentures.

In 2012, a new AVentures Capital Venture Fund was launched for investing in IT startups having R&D in Ukraine and Central Eastern Europe.

The fund focuses on investments in industries such as software, e -commerce, cloud services, mobile technologies, IOT and others.

As of 2021, there were 24 companies in AVentures Capital portfolio.

In November 2015, Kolodyuk joined the Supervisory Board of the International Ciklum Software Development Company after promoting the Ukrainian Redevelopment Fund.

In 2022, data protection startup with Ukrainian roots Spin Technology which was backed by AVentures raised $16M in a Series A round with a $55 million valuation.

Social activities and views 
In 2001 he became a co-founder and a President and an international expert of the All-Ukrainian Foundation "Information Society of Ukraine".

Since July 2003, he has headed the working group "Electronic Ukraine", which worked on the creation of the project "National Strategy for Development of the Information Society of Ukraine".

He is the author of research analyzes in the field of information society. He is the co-authors of Promoting Enavironment for Information Society Development in Cis Countries.

In 2014, Kolodyuk became a member of the Brain Basket Foundation Supervisory Board, whose purpose is to improve the level of education in Ukraine.

In August 2014, he initiated the founding of UVCA (Ukrainian Association of Venture Capital and Direct Investments), and in November 2014 he was elected a chairman of the Supervisory Board of the Association. The purpose of the Association is to promote Ukraine's investment capabilities.

In 2015, in Kyivpost interview Kolodyuk said that "building a startup nation is a new Ukrainian dream".

In 2018, during the World Economic Forum, Kolodyuk initiated the founding of the Ukrainian House in Davos and joined his organizational committee.

In 2018, Kolodyuk commented to Financial Times that "early adoption of blockchain technology has given Ukraine an edge compared to other regulation-heavy countries".

UVCA in partnership with Western NIS Enterprise Fund and the Viktor Pinchuk Foundation contributed to the development of the project.

In 2022, afther the Russian invasion of Ukraine, Andriy Kolodyuk co-founded with Jan Thys the Free Ukraine Foundation, a non-profit in Belgium to assist Ukrainian people and businesses affected by the war.

Political activity 
In November 2004, Kolodyuk was a participant in the Orange Revolution and participated in the Hi-Tech march in support of democracy and truth.

From 2005 to 2010, he headed the Information Ukraine Party. He supported the position that Ukraine has no effective and coordinated legislative framework for the development of an ICT industry.

After the 2006 parliament elections, he decided to leave politics. He later said that in two years in politics he gained experience more than 10 years in business.

During the Revolution of Dignity, Kolodyuk was one of the organizers of the IT tent on the Independence Square in Kyiv.

Controversies 
In 2015, the Ministry of Internal Affairs seized 2 servers and computer equipment from Divan.tv. The reason was a statement to the Darnytskyi District Court from the Chairman of the Anti-Pirate Committee on broadcasting the Russian TV channel "HD Kino 100". After 2 months the company won the courts, and the equipment was returned.

In 2019, the media spread the materials that were intended to compromise Kolodyuk among colleagues and partners. In his Facebook, he reported that he feels a psychological pressure in order to steel his business in a corporate raid manner.

In the spring of the same year, 2019, a class-action lawsuit was filed against Kolodyuk to repay a total debt of $3.8 million. The plaintiffs were Mykola Novikov and Karine Chiftalaryan. The news was immediately picked up by a number of Ukrainian media. According to Kolodyuk, he borrowed money from Ruben Chiftalaryan, whose grandson was one of the plaintiffs, and returned them witt real estate and corporate rights to assets as weel as with money.

At the end of 2021, the Kyiv Court of Appeals denied Mykola Novikov and Karina Chiftalaryan a claim against Kolodyuk in the amount of $3.8 million.

Subsequently, the independent media monitoring service Attack Index released an investigation in which it called all media reports concerning Kolodyuk lawsuits a planned information attack against Kolodyuk, and estimated such a media campaign worth near $20,000.

See also
Information Ukraine

External links

References 

1971 births
Ukrainian inventors
American technology company founders
Businesspeople in information technology
Businesspeople in software
Living people
Businesspeople from Kyiv
Kyiv Polytechnic Institute alumni
Taras Shevchenko National University of Kyiv alumni
21st-century American inventors